Pleasure to Burn is the second album by American hard rock band Systematic, released on April 15, 2003.

Track listing

Personnel
 Tim Narducci - vocals and guitar
 Adam Ruppel - guitar
 Johnny Bechtel - bass
 Paul Bostaph - drums

Production notes
 Mixed by Mike Plotnikoff and Howard Benson at Skip Saylor Devonshire Studios, North Hollywood, California
 Recorded by Mike Plotnikoff at Bay 7 Studios, Valley Village, California and Sparky Dark Studio, Calabasas, California
 Mastered by Tom Baker at Precision Mastering, Hollywood, California

References

2003 albums
Systematic (band) albums